The 1987 Torneo Godó was a men's professional tennis tournament that took place on outdoor clay courts at the Real Club de Tenis Barcelona in Barcelona, Catalonia in Spain that was part of the 1987 Grand Prix circuit. It was the 35th edition of the tournament and took place from 21 September to 27 September 1987. Fifth-seeded Martín Jaite won the singles title.

Finals

Singles

 Martín Jaite defeated  Mats Wilander 7–6(7–5), 6–4, 4–6, 0–6, 6–4
 It was Jaite's 1st singles title and the 4th of his career.

Doubles

 Miloslav Mečíř /  Tomáš Šmíd defeated  Javier Frana /  Christian Miniussi 6–1, 6–2

References

External links
 Official tournament website
 ITF tournament edition details
 ATP tournament profile

Barcelona Open (tennis)
Torneo Godo
Torneo Godó
Torneo Godó